Alexandre Coria (born 22 January 1993) is a French rally co-driver. He is the co-driver of Adrien Fourmaux for M-Sport Ford in the World Rally Championship.

Rally results

References

External links
 Alexandre Coria's e-wrc profile

1993 births
Living people
French rally co-drivers
World Rally Championship co-drivers